Takumi Mori (born 5 October 1963) is a Japanese wrestler. He competed in the men's Greco-Roman 68 kg at the 1992 Summer Olympics.

References

1963 births
Living people
Japanese male sport wrestlers
Olympic wrestlers of Japan
Wrestlers at the 1992 Summer Olympics
Sportspeople from Tokushima Prefecture
Asian Games medalists in wrestling
Wrestlers at the 1986 Asian Games
Wrestlers at the 1990 Asian Games
Wrestlers at the 1994 Asian Games
Asian Games silver medalists for Japan
Asian Games bronze medalists for Japan
Medalists at the 1986 Asian Games
Medalists at the 1990 Asian Games
Medalists at the 1994 Asian Games
20th-century Japanese people
21st-century Japanese people